Mozaffari was a steam yacht that was converted to a gunboat. Launched in 1899 as a Belgian merchant ship, it was purchased as a royal yacht for Mozaffar ad-Din Shah Qajar and served Persian navy from 1902 to 1914; and again between 1918 and 1936. Royal Navy seized her in 1914 and used it until 1918 during World War I.

History
The vessel was built in Nantes, France in 1899, according to Jane's. Originally named Selika, she was owned by Robert Osterrieth. Soon after it was launched, Adrien de Gerlache took over as her captain for an expedition to the Persian Gulf, seeking pearl. On her journey Selika decked at Muscat and Bahrain.

In April 1904, Mozaffari was used in an operation to hoist Persian flag at Abu Musa and Tunbs after removing those of Sharjah.

An American diplomat reported in 1925 that Persepolis and Mozaffari were the two largest vessels of Iran.

It was stricken  1936.

See also

 List of ship launches in 1899
 Historical Iranian Navy vessels

References

1899 ships
Merchant ships of Belgium
Naval ships of Iran
Royal and presidential yachts
Steam yachts
Gunboats
Captured ships
World War I naval ships of the United Kingdom
Ships built in France
Military history of Qajar Iran